Anthony Hamilton  (1739–1812) was an Anglican priest, Archdeacon of Colchester from 1775.

Life
His father Alexander Hamilton was the fifth son of William Hamilton the Scottish antiquarian, who died in 1724. He had married the heiress Charlotte Styles, and so acquired the Essex manor of Holyfield (Hallifield), in the north-east of the parish of Waltham Abbey which remained in the family into the 19th century. The Hamilton family owned also the Debden Hall farm and estate (see Debden House). The owner of Debden Hall was Alex. Hamilton on a map of 1777. Venn's Alumni Cantabrigienses proposes the identification of Alexander Hamilton as the London solicitor of the name. He moved to Loughton, transferring the remains of Charlotte and three children to be reburied there in 1744.

Anthony Hamilton junior was a younger son of the marriage. He was educated at Harrow School and entered Corpus Christi College, Cambridge in 1755. He graduated B.A. there in 1760, M.A. in 1763, and D.D. in 1775.

Ordained deacon in 1762 and priest in 1763, he became vicar of Fulham, and then in 1766 of Orsett in Essex. In 1770, on the death of John Jortin, he became Archdeacon of London, giving up the post in 1775 to become Archdeacon of Colchester. He was elected a Fellow of the Society of Antiquaries of London in 1773, and of the Royal Society in 1777.

In 1776 Hamilton became rector of Much Hadham in Hertfordshire and gave up his Fulham living; he became also vicar of St Martin-in-the-Fields. In the 1790s he lived at 16 Savile Row, London. He was buried at Loughton, with memorials set up in the Much Hadham and Little Hadham churches.

Family
Hamilton married Anne Terrick, daughter of Richard Terrick. Their first son was William Richard Hamilton and their second son Anthony Hamilton the Archdeacon of Taunton and the father of Bishop Walter Kerr Hamilton.

Notes

1739 births
1812 deaths
18th-century English Anglican priests
Alumni of Corpus Christi College, Cambridge
Archdeacons of Colchester
Archdeacons of London
Fellows of the Royal Society
Fellows of the Society of Antiquaries of London
People educated at Harrow School
People from East Hertfordshire District
Burials in Essex